Parcoblatta uhleriana, the Uhler's wood cockroach, is a species of Parcoblatta native to the United States and Canada. It is a forest species also found in disturbed and urban environments. The male of the species flies freely, while the female does not fly.

Description
The male Parcoblatta uhleriana is a mostly uniform pale brownish-yellow, with slightly darker tegmina (outer forewings). It is relatively slender, with a broad head, and brownish stripe from the middle of its eyes downward. Its pronotum (the shield behind its head) is subelliptical (nearly elliptical), widest at the middle, and rounded angles.

The female of the species coloration is more variable, but is usually a shining blackish-brown, and sometimes a dark reddish-brown except its abdomen. Most of the legs, and the edges of the tegmina, are a chestnut brown. It is broader, with a wider head, than the male. Its pronotum is suborbicular (nearly round), widest near the base. Tegmina at most reach the second abdominal segment, and its wings are rudimentary.

Females are readily distinguished from allied species by their short, separated tegmina and shining black color, while males are more difficult to separate from P. fulvescens and P. virginica.

It has a row of small, well-spaced conical projections which set it apart as "an entirely different type from that known for any other species of the genus".

Distribution
The distribution of the species is limited to the Ontario, Canada and the eastern United States, including Alabama, Connecticut, Delaware, District of Columbia, Florida, Georgia, Illinois, Indiana, Iowa, Kansas, Maryland, Massachusetts, Michigan, Mississippi, Missouri, New Jersey, New York, North Carolina, Pennsylvania, Tennessee, and Virginia.

Habitat
Parcoblatta uhleriana is considered a dense deciduous forest species, with a preference for microhabitats that have deep, moist leaf mold and plant litter, but is also found along the borders of wooded areas, as well as in suburban areas. It is often found beneath both dry and damp leaves, pine needles, and other debris, as well as under loose bark, in decaying logs, on foliage, grass, and on roads at night.

A study of habitat preferences in Kansas found that in forested areas, females were usually observed on the ground, while males were primarily found on bushes, though also found on the ground or grass. In disturbed areas, female were also moving on the ground, while males were usually seen on or flying to blades of grass. Males were found at a mean height of 71 cm in forest areas, or 42 cm in nonforest areas, while females were found at a mean height of 7 cm in forest areas, and 5 cm in nonforest areas.

A survey of ants and cockroaches outside suburban houses in the Raleigh, North Carolina area found P. uhleriana the most frequently caught cockroach species, using soil-level pitfall traps.

Behavior
Nocturnal observations of feeding adults have found the species eating mushrooms, moss, bird feces and mammalian cartilage. Females feeding on a mushroom were observed biting, kicking, lunging, and posturing when they contacted one another. Males and females in a laboratory study showed similar levels of agonism in same-sex encounters, with no agonism in about 31-36% of encounters, threat in 42-48% of encounters, kicking or biting by one cockroach in 19-20% of encounters, and kicking or biting by both cockroaches in 2% of encounters.

Males are often attracted to and fly to light, and females are attracted to molasses used as a bait. The species has also been reported to be attracted at night to honeydew secreted by aphids on pear species.

Symbiotic associates 

The fungal species Herpomyces arietinus was found to infect P. uhleriana nymphs in a laboratory, possibly through contact with infected P. virginica.

The protozoan species Gregarina parcoblattae is found in the midgut of P. uhleriana as well as P pensylvanica.

The nematode species Protrellus aurifluus is found in the intestinal tract of both P. uhleriana and P. lata.

An unidentified species of mite in the hypopial (migratory larval) stage was found deeply embedded in the body fat of two P. uhleriana individuals in North Carolina.

The wasp species Hyptia harpyoides parasitizes the ootheca of P. uhleriana, as well as P. virginica and P pensylvanica. The last instar larva of the wasp overwinters inside the ootheca.

Additional Images

References

External links

Black and white photographs of top view of P. uhleriana male, and female with ootheca, from Smithsonian Miscellaneous Collections.
Black and white photograph of Hyptia harpyoides wasp nymph with P. uhleriana ootheca from which it emerged, from Smithsonian Miscellaneous Collections.

Cockroaches
Insects of North America
Insects described in 1862
Taxa named by Henri Louis Frédéric de Saussure